is a former Japanese football player and manager. His elder brother Mikio Manaka is also a former footballer.

Playing career
Manaka was born in Bando on January 31, 1971. After graduating from high school, he joined Japan Soccer League club Sumitomo Metal (later Kashima Antlers) in 1989. In 1992, Japan Soccer League was folded and founded new league J1 League. He played many matches as substitutes and the club won the champions 1996, 1998 J1 League, 1997 J.League Cup and 1997 Emperor's Cup. He moved to Cerezo Osaka in 1999. He also played as midfielder not only forward. He moved to Sanfrecce Hiroshima in August 2003 and Yokohama FC in July 2004. At Yokohama FC, he played with his elder brother Mikio Manaka. He retired end of 2004 season.

Coaching career
After retirement, Manaka became a manager for L.League club Konomiya Speranza Osaka-Takatsuki in 2017. However he resigned in October 2017.

Record
Manaka holds the record for the fastest J1 League hat-trick ever. On July 14, 2001, he scored three goals in three minutes for Cerezo Osaka against Kashiwa Reysol, the goals coming in the 72nd, 73rd and 75th minutes.

Club statistics

References

External links

biglobe.ne.jp

1971 births
Living people
Association football people from Ibaraki Prefecture
Japanese footballers
Japan Soccer League players
J1 League players
J2 League players
Kashima Antlers players
Cerezo Osaka players
Sanfrecce Hiroshima players
Yokohama FC players
Japanese football managers
Association football forwards